An election to the County Council of London took place on 2 March 1922. It was the eleventh triennial election of the whole council. There were sixty dual member constituencies and one four member constituency, making a total of 124 seats. The council was elected by First Past the Post with each elector having two votes in the dual member seats.

National government background
The Prime Minister of the day was the Liberal David Lloyd George who led a Coalition Government that included the Unionist Party and those Liberals and Socialists who had broken from the main Liberal and Labour parties who sat in opposition. The Coalition was numerically dominated by the Unionists who were still 7 months away from overthrowing Lloyd George. 
The Coalition had been losing parliamentary seats in by-elections to both opposition parties including two in London to Labour; at 1921 Southwark South East by-election and during the council election campaign at 1922 Camberwell North by-election where one of the incumbent London Labour councillors Charles Ammon was elected to parliament on 20 February 1922. Ten days later, the electors of Camberwell North re-elected him to the County Council.

London Council background

Although the Municipal Reform Party had an overall majority, in line with national politics, they decided late in 1917 to form a war-time coalition to mirror the national government. Some Progressive Party members were offered chairmanships of committees. This coalition had continued after the war ended, but both parties, along with the Labour Party, fought the 1922 elections on separate platforms.

Candidates
The leader of the Municipal Reform Party did not defend his seat, but was expected to remain a member when the new council appointed its new aldermen. 
There was no county wide electoral agreements between any of the parties, though clearly there had been some locally agreed situations. There were very few constituencies where all three parties stood two candidates. In the past, the Progressive Party had encompassed the Labour Party, with candidates running in harness. That situation had recently ended when former Progressive Party councillor Harry Gosling became leader of the Labour Party. In its place there were a few Progressive candidates running in harness with Municipal Reform candidates. Among Labour's candidates were members of the recently formed Communist Party, such as Albert Inkpin.

Outcome
Labour suffered a setback when their Leader, Harry Gosling was defeated at Kennington, thanks to an electoral arrangement between the Progressives and the Municipal Reformers, although he regained the seat at a by-election a month later. Labour had mixed results, managing to more or less hold their own. The leader of the Progressive Party, John Scott Lidgett, was also unseated at Rotherhithe, although he was able to remain a member of the council when he was appointed an alderman. The big winners were the Municipal Reform Party, who made a number of gains at the expense of the Progressives.

Constituency results
Incumbent Councillors shown in bold.

Battersea

Bermondsey

Bethnal Green

Camberwell

Chelsea

City of London

Deptford

Finsbury

Fulham

Greenwich

Hackney

Hammersmith

Hampstead

Holborn

Islington

 Naylor had contested the seat in 1919 as a Municipal Reform candidate.

Kensington

Lambeth

Lewisham

Paddington

Poplar

St Marylebone

St Pancras

Shoreditch

Southwark

Stepney

Stoke Newington

Wandsworth

Westminster

Woolwich

Aldermen
The council also appointed 20 aldermen, to serve for a 6-year term.
After the elections, there were eleven aldermanic vacancies and the following alderman were appointed by the newly elected council;
John Jacob Astor, Municipal Reform 
Alfred Ordway Goodrich, Municipal Reform (retiring councillor for Mile End)
George Hopwood Hume, Municipal Reform (retiring councillor for Greenwich)
Dr Florence Barrie Lambert, Municipal Reform (retiring councillor for Brixton)
Ronald Collet Norman, Municipal Reform (retiring councillor for Chelsea)
Jessie Wilton Phipps, Municipal Reform 
Sir Harry Lushington Stephen, Municipal Reform 
Herbert Arthur Baker, Progressive (retiring councillor for Camberwell North)
Dr John Scott Lidgett, Progressive (retiring councillor for Rotherhithe)
George Masterman Gillett, Labour (retiring Progressive councillor for Finsbury)
Albert Emil Davies, Labour (re-appointed)

By-elections 1922-1925
There was one by-election to a fill casual vacancy during the term of the twelfth London County Council.

Lambeth, Kennington, 29 April 1922
 Cause: death of Sir John Williams Benn, 10 April 1922

Aldermanic vacancies filled 1922-1925
There were six casual vacancies among the aldermen in the term of the eleventh London County Council, which were filled as follows: 
24 October 1922: Arthur Acland Allen (Progressive) to serve until 1925 in place of Henry Evan Auguste Cotton, resigned 17 October 1922. Allen had previously sat as a councillor from 1899 to 1913. 
30 January 1923: Mrs Anna Maria Mathew (Labour) to serve until 1925 in place of her husband Charles James Mathew, died 8 January 1923.
23 October 1923: Maj. Harry Barnes (Progressive) to serve until 1925 in place of Henry de Rosenbach Walker, died 31 July 1923.
5 February 1924: Henry Thomas McAuliffe (Municipal Reform) to serve until 1925 in place of Viscount Hill, died 19 December 1923.
18 March 1924: Alfred Baker (Labour) to serve until 1925 in place of George Masterman Gillett resigned 11 March 1924. Baker had previously sat as a councillor from 1919 to 1922.
25 November 1924: Hon. Gilbert Johnstone (Municipal Reform) to serve until 1925 in place of Sir Cyril Jackson died 3 September 1924. Johnstone had previously sat as a councillor from 1907 to 1910 and 1911–1917.

References

1922 elections in the United Kingdom
County Council election
1922 English local elections
London County Council elections
March 1922 events